Lowry House may refer to:

in the United States (by state then cite)
Lowry House (Huntsville, Alabama), listed on the National Register of Historic Places (NRHP)
Lowry Pueblo, Pleasant View, Colorado, a U.S. National Historic Landmark in Montezuma County, Colorado
William Lowry House (Bentonville, Indiana), listed on the National Register of Historic Places in Fayette County, Indiana
William C. Lowry House Nicholasville, Kentucky, listed on the National Register of Historic Places in Jessamine County, Kentucky
William Lowry House (Athens, Tennessee), listed on the National Register of Historic Places in McMinn County, Tennessee
James Lowry House, Greeneville, Tennessee, listed on the National Register of Historic Places in Greene County, Tennessee
Smith-Marcuse-Lowry House, Austin, Texas, listed on the NRHP in Harris County, Texas
Fayette C. Lowry House, Houston, Texas, listed on the National Register of Historic Places in Harris County, Texas

See also
William Lowry House (disambiguation)